Nancy Nasrallah is a Lebanese pop singer who participated in SuperStar (Arabic TV series) Later, she participated in The Voice Ahla Sawt season 2 and she was in the Saber Rebaï team .

Discography

Singles
 50 Alf series song (2018)
 Ma Fik (2017)
 Eid bi Eid (2016)
 No'ta Aal Sater (2015)
 Batal Majrouh (2015)
 Set Al Habayeb (2015)
 Gheblak Shi Yawm (2015)

Videography

References

External links 
 

1983 births
Musicians from Beirut
21st-century Lebanese women singers
Lebanese pop singers
Idols (franchise) participants
Contestants from Arabic singing competitions
Living people